"Πόσο Λυπάμαι" is the second studio album by the Greek singer-songwriter Dispero. It was a whole album with fourteen musical creations and was released by "Ghetolabel" in collaboration with the record company "Universal" on April 22, 2005.

Background and development

From December, 2004 to March, 2005 Dispero created his new cd. He experimented with new and different sounds, mixing them up with rap music. After many experiments he concluded between a rap and reggae-ragga mix where they were gathered altogether and created his second record. The cd had the title "Πόσο Λυπάμαι".

Recording and production

"Πόσο Λυπάμαι" is a complete cd/album with fourteen musical creations. Eleven of them are songs, one orchestrical intro, one orchestrical outro and one more is a media video clip. The total time was 58:54. The music was rap, reggae and ragga with Hellenic lyrics infused with everyday stories with social messages. The collaborators that took part in the cd/album are the following: Adamantas(locos siempre), Hrizmo(Θρυλική ομάδα), Mpelafon(Κρυφή ραψωδία), Δραματοποιός(Ε.Φ.Ε.Σ.Η.), Diman(B.M.C.) and Alicia(U.G.C.). Every music production was created by Dispero and "Ghetolabel recording studio" except half the "mixtape" which was created by Hrizmo(Θρυλική ομάδα) and granted for their collaboration.

The mastering was made by "music kitchen recording studio" based in Thessaloniki, from Bambino. The video clip in the album with the name "Είμαστε εδώ" from "locos siempre" with a total time of 3:37 was a creation of Adamantas. "Πόσο Λυπάμαι" was released on April 22, 2005 in Greece and Cyprus by "Ghetolabel" in collaboration with the record company "Universal".

Cover artwork

Digital designs and artworks were made by Jamster, member of (031) and the photoshoot was by Didgytah, member of "Ghetolabel film maker".

Track listing

References

2005 albums
Hip hop albums by Greek artists
Reggae albums
Ragga albums